Askale Tiksa (born 21 July 1994) is an Ethiopian race walker. She competed in the women's 20 kilometres walk event at the 2016 Summer Olympics.

References

External links
 

1994 births
Living people
Ethiopian female racewalkers
Place of birth missing (living people)
Athletes (track and field) at the 2016 Summer Olympics
Olympic athletes of Ethiopia
African Games bronze medalists for Ethiopia
African Games medalists in athletics (track and field)
Athletes (track and field) at the 2015 African Games
20th-century Ethiopian women
21st-century Ethiopian women